On to Victory is the ninth studio album recorded by the English rock band Humble Pie and the first with a new lineup including vocalist and guitarist Steve Marriott, drummer Jerry Shirley, vocalist and guitarist Bobby Tench from The Jeff Beck Group, and American bassist Anthony "Sooty" Jones. They recorded "Fool for a Pretty Face", which Marriott had written earlier and the song proved good enough for them to secure a recording contract with Atco in 1980. In UK their material was released by Jet Records, owned by the former Small Faces manager Don Arden. The album peaked #60 on the Billboard 200 album chart "Fool for a Pretty Face" was released as a single and reached #58 on the US singles charts and a promotional tour followed as part of The Rock'n Roll Marathon, supporting Frank Marino & Mahogany Rush, Angel & Mother's Finest.

Track listing

Side one
"Fool for a Pretty Face" (Marriott, Shirley) 4:12
"You Soppy Pratt" (Marriott, Jones, Shirley) 4:08
"Infatuation" (Marriott) 3:45
"Take It from Here" (Marriott) 3:39 
"Savin' It" (Tench, Marriott) 4:41

Side two
"Baby Don't You Do It" (Holland-Dozier-Holland) 3:25
"Get It in the End" (Marriott, Jones, Shirley) 2:41
"My Lover's Prayer" (Otis Redding) 4:02
"Further Down the Road" (Marriott, Tench, Jones, Shirley) 4:29
"Over You" (Allen Orange, Clarence Toussaint ) 2:22

Single
A-side "Fool for a Pretty Face" (Marriott, Shirley) B-side "You Soppy Prat" (Marriott, Jones, Shirley)

Personnel
Humble Pie
Steve Marriott – guitar, harmonica, keyboards, vocals
Bobby Tench – guitar, vocals
Anthony "Sooty" Jones – bass, vocals
Jerry Shirley – drums

Additional personnel
Cheryl Ashley – backing vocals
Marge Raymond – backing vocals
Lisa Zimmerman – backing vocals

Production
Produced by The Pie and Johnny Wright
Recorded 
Remixed at Soundworks, New York, New York
Engineered by John Wright, Akili Walker, Claig

References 

Sources
Paolo Hewitt; John Hellier (2004). Steve Marriott - All Too Beautiful....  Helter Skelter Publishing  .
Muise, Dan. Gallagher, Marriott, Derringer & Trower: Their lives and music. Hal Leonard Corporation (2002). 

1980 albums
Humble Pie (band) albums
Atco Records albums
Jet Records albums